Taczanowski (Polish feminine: Taczanowska; plural: Taczanowscy) is the surname of a Polish szlachta (nobility) family from Poznań bearing the Jastrzębiec coat of arms and the motto: Plus penser que dire. They took their name from their estate Taczanów in the 15th century and by the 19th century were among the leading magnates in partitioned-Poland. Members of the family are historically significant  religious, political, scientific, and military figures. The family was granted the title of count by King Friedrich Wilhelm IV of Prussia in 1857. The Austrian branch of the family, which spells the name Dassanowsky, came to Vienna with the forces of King Jan Sobieski during the Battle of Vienna in 1683.

Notable members

Notable members include:

 Jan Scibor Taczanowski (15th century-1468), voivode of Łęczyca c. 1437
 Andrzej Taczanowski (c. 1660-18th century), knight commander under King Sobieski during the Turkish Siege (Battle of Vienna) of 1683
 Rafael Taczanowski (18th century), head of the Jesuit Order in Poland
 Jan Taczanowski (1753-19th century), Lord High Steward of Trembowia
 Maksymilian Taczanowski (177?-1852), landowner and national revolutionary
 Count Alfons Anton Felix von Taczanow-Taczanowski (1815–1867), member of the Prussian House of Lords
 Władysław Taczanowski (1819–1890), zoologist
 Wladislaw von Taczanowski (1825–1893), politician; Prussian parliamentary representative
 Edmund Taczanowski (1833–1879), general and Polish patriot; in Italy with Giuseppe Garibaldi
 Hubert Taczanowski (1960- ), cinematographer
 Tomasz Józef Taczanowski (1956- ), movie entrepreneur, collector of modern art

Coat of arms

See also
 
 Dassanowsky

Selected literature
 Gothaisches Taschenbuch der gräflichen Häuser, Perthes Verlag, Gotha 1857–1870
 P. P. Paprocki, Herby Rycerstwa polskiego, Kraków 1858
 Genealogisches Taschenbuch der Ritter- und Adelsgeschlechter (Brünner Taschenbuch), Brünn 1890
 Teodor Zychlinski, Zlota Ksiega szlachty polskiej, Poznań 1879–1908
 Stefan Graf von Szydlow-Szydlowski und Nikolaus R. von Pastinszky, Der polnische und litauische Hochadel, Budapest 1944
 Simon Konarski, Armorial de la noblesse polonaise titrée, Paris 1958
 Günther Berger, "Die Familie v. Dassanowsky: Die kaisertreue österreichische Linie des polnischen Grafenhauses Taczanowski zu Taczanow," Krone und Reich: Zeitschrift des Verbandes der Österreicher zur Wahrung der Geschichte Österreichs, 1/2 1999, 13–15.
 Genealogisches Handbuch des Adels, Adelslexikon Band XIV, Band 131 der Gesamtreihe, C. A. Starke Verlag, Limburg (Lahn) 2003, .